La Coma i la Pedra is a municipality in the comarca of the Solsonès in Catalonia, Spain. It is situated in the Lord valley in the north of the comarca. The Cardener river has its source in the territory of the municipality. The local economy is traditionally based on livestock raising, although there is also a ski resort in the pyrenean massif of Port del Comte and a power station at Gafa. Local roads link the municipality with Sant Llorenç de Morunys and Josa i Tuixén.

Subdivisions 
The municipality of La Coma i la Pedra is formed by three villages. Populations are given as of 2005:
La Coma (137)
La Pedra (64), at the foot of the Pratformiu range
El Port del Comte (69)

Demography

References

 Panareda Clopés, Josep Maria; Rios Calvet, Jaume; Rabella Vives, Josep Maria (1989). Guia de Catalunya, Barcelona: Caixa de Catalunya.  (Spanish).  (Catalan).

External links
Official website 
 Government data pages 

Municipalities in Solsonès
Populated places in Solsonès